Troilius may refer to:

 Samuel Troilius, Archbishop of Uppsala in the Church of Sweden from 1758 to 1764

It may also mean:
 Troilus, a young Trojan prince in classical mythology
 Troilus family, Swedish family